Stephen Michael McGuinness (born 14 June 1965 in Bristol, England), also known as Steve Mac, is an English house music producer and DJ. As a solo artist, he runs Variation Recordings.

Biography 
Mac started out as a scratch DJ at the age of 11. He met his production partner Rob Chetcuti in a hip-hop group in Malta. They formed the group, Rhythm Masters.

Mac and Chetcuti also set up a studio followed by a record label, Disfunktional Recordings in 1995. The label was mainly a showcase for the pair's own productions although artists such as Danny Tenaglia, Junior Sanchez, Paul Woolford and Giorgio Moroder also contributed.

Rhythm Masters split in 2002 to pursue solo projects, with Mac producing tracks including "Circus Parade", "Da Canto" and "Lovin' You More (That Big Track)" for record company CR2.  Mac also remixed for Jamiroquai, Charlotte Church and Simply Red. The track "Lovin' You More" is used on the Radio Station "Vladivostok FM" on Grand Theft Auto: The Ballad of Gay Tony.

In 2008, Mac released the track "Gotta Have Some Fun"; and in September that year his track "Paddy's Revenge" (sampling Penguin Cafe Orchestra's 1984 song "Music for a Found Harmonium") reached number 17 in the UK Singles Chart.

Mac's most recent release is the track "The Fly" also for CR2.

References

External links
Steve Mac on Discogs
Official Myspace

Living people
Remixers
English DJs
English house musicians
English record producers
House DJs
DJs from Bristol
Club DJs
1965 births
Electronic dance music DJs
Musicians from Bristol